Christophe Chabouté, (born 8 February 1967) is a French comics artist.

Biography 
Chabouté was born on February 8, 1967; he is of Alsatian heritage. Chabouté attended Fine Arts courses in Angoulême and Strasbourg. The publishing house Vents d'Ouest published his first pieces in 1993 in Les Récits, a collective album about Arthur Rimbaud. But Chabouté became best known in 1998 by publishing Sorcières by Éditions du Téméraire (awarded at the Illzach Festival) and Quelques jours d'été by Editions Paquet (Alph'Art Coup de Coeur Festival Angoulême). He has also illustrated novels for young people. His work  Tout Seul (Alone), which is translated into English by Ivanka Hahnenberger, is considered his masterpiece.

Works

Albums 

 Sorcières, Le Téméraire, 1998 (rééd. Vents d'Ouest, 2001)
 Quelques jours d'été, éditions Paquet, 1998 (rééd. 1999 & 2004)
 Zoé, collection Intégra, Vents d'Ouest, 1999
 Pleine lune, collection Intégra, Vents d'Ouest, 2000
 Un îlot de bonheur, Paquet, 2001
 La bête, collection Intégra, Vents d'Ouest, 2002
 Purgatoire, collection Equinoxe, Vents d'Ouest

 Livre 1, 2003
 Livre 2, 2004
 Livre 3, 2005

 Henri Désiré Landru, collection Intégra, Vents d'Ouest, 2006
 Construire un feu, collection Equinoxe, Vents d'Ouest, 2007 – After the 1907 novel by Jack London – Prix Cognac du Meilleur Album "One Shot" 2008
Alone (Tout seul), Vents d'Ouest, 2008 – (Sélection officielle du Festival d'Angoulême 2009)
 Terre-Neuvas, collection Intégra, Vents d'Ouest, 2009
 Fables Amères, De Tout Petits Riens, Vents d'Ouest, 2010
 Princesses aussi vont au petit coin (Les), Vents d'Ouest, 2011
 The Park Bench (Un peu de bois et d'acier), Vents d'Ouest, 2012
 Moby Dick, Vents d'Ouest – After the 1851 work by Herman Melville

 Livre Premier, 2014
 Livre Second, 2014

 Fables amères, Détails futiles, Vents d'Ouest, 2019
 Yellow Cab, Vents d'Ouest, 2021 – After the book by Benoît Cohen

Illustrations 

 La chute du corbeau, écrit par Jean-Charles Bernardini, Mango Jeunesse, coll Le cercle magique, 2003

Adaptations 
Un peu de bois et d'acier (The Park Bench) was adapted into a silent black and white 45-minutes short film  directed by Antonin Le Guay (Sandgate Productions) in 2014. It was partly funded through the crowfunding platform Kiss Kiss Bank Bank from 2 to 27 June 2014. The funding ended on 134%.

The French music group L'Étrange K and the association Scènes occupation signed in April 2016 an adaptation of the same Chabouté comic strip in "BD-concert" (diffusion of the comic book accompanied by live music).

Awards 

 1999 : Alph-Art coup de cœur at festival d'Angoulême for Quelques jours d'été
 2002 : Special mention of the Angoulême jury for  Un îlot de bonheur
 2006 : Grand Prix RTL de la bande dessinée fotHenri Désiré Landru
 2010 : Prix de la BD polar Expérience - Evene à l'occasion du festival Quais du Polar de Lyon for Terre-Neuvas

References

Annexes

Bibliography

External links 
 Unofficial site

1967 births
Living people
French comics artists